The 2020–21 NIFL Premiership (known as the Danske Bank Premiership for sponsorship reasons) was the 13th season of Northern Ireland's highest national football league in this format since its inception in 2008, the 120th season of Irish league football overall, and the eighth season since the creation of the Northern Ireland Football League. The ongoing COVID-19 pandemic in Northern Ireland at the time meant that the start of the season was delayed by approximately two months. The 38-game season commenced on 16 October 2020 and concluded on 29 May 2021, with the European play-offs then taking place on 1 and 5 June 2021. The fixtures were released on 19 September 2020.

Linfield were the two-time defending champions, having been league winners in the previous two seasons - the curtailed 2019–20 season seeing them win a then world record-equalling 54th league title. This season Linfield won a third consecutive title, once again equalling the world record for the most top flight league titles in club football, drawing level with Rangers, who had just won their 55th Scottish title two months earlier. Linfield entered the 2021–22 UEFA Champions League first qualifying round, while runners-up Coleraine and 3rd-placed Glentoran joined the European play-off winners, Larne, in the 2021–22 UEFA Europa Conference League first qualifying round.

There was no relegation from the Premiership this season, after a majority of NIFL Championship clubs voted to cancel their 2020–21 season, having not played any league fixtures since the 2019–20 season had initially been suspended in March 2020. The second and third tiers had not been granted 'elite' sporting status by the IFA which was required in order to continue playing matches during the COVID-19 pandemic lockdown.

Teams

Twelve teams competed in the 2020–21 NIFL Premiership, eleven of which had retained their Premiership status from the previous season. Last season's bottom Premiership club, Institute, were relegated to the NIFL Championship after two seasons in the top flight, and were replaced by Portadown, who were promoted to this season's Premiership as 2019–20 NIFL Championship winners. This marked Portadown's return to the top flight for the first time since the 2016–17 season.

The promotion/relegation play-off did not take place the previous season, as a result of the COVID-19 pandemic.

Stadia and locations

League table

Results

Matches 1–22
During matches 1–22 each team played every other team twice (home and away).

Matches 23–33
During matches 23–33 each team played every other team for the third time (either at home, or away).

Matches 34–38
For the final five matches the table was then split into two halves, with teams ranked 1st–6th in Section A and teams ranked 7th–12th in Section B. During matches 34–38 each team played every other team in their respective section once. The fixtures were reversed from those played during rounds 23–33, ensuring that teams had played every other team in their respective section twice at home and twice away overall throughout the season.

Section A

Section B

Play-offs

UEFA Europa Conference League play-offs
The play-offs were one-off matches with extra time and penalties used to determine the winner if necessary, with the higher-ranked teams given home advantage against the lower-ranked teams (i.e. 4th v. 7th and 5th v. 6th) in the semi-finals. The higher-ranked of the two semi-final winners also had home advantage in the final.

As Linfield won the 2020–21 Irish Cup and also qualified for the Champions League, the 3rd-placed team qualified for the Europa Conference League directly, vacating one of the play-off places. As a result, the remaining four clubs that finished in 4th–7th place competed for one place in the 2021–22 Europa Conference League first qualifying round.

The semi-finals were played on 1 June 2021, with the final played on 5 June 2021. Larne were the play-off winners, qualifying for European football for the first time in the club's history.

Semi-finals

Final

Statistics

Top goalscorers

Clean Sheets

References

External links

NIFL Premiership seasons
Northern Ireland
2020–21 in Northern Ireland association football